Drain may refer to:

Objects and processes
 Drain (plumbing), a fixture that provides an exit-point for waste water or for water that is to be re-circulated on the side of a road
 Floor drain
 Drain (surgery), a tube used to remove pus or other fluids from a wound
 Drainage, the natural or artificial removal of surface and sub-surface water from a given area
 French drain, a system that redirects surface water and groundwater away from an area
 Slot drain
 Storm drain, a system of collecting and disposing of rain water in an urban area
 Drain (transistor), a terminal in a field effect transistor

Art and entertainment
 Drain (band), an American noise rock band
 Drain (comics), a comic book series starring a vampire
 Drain STH, a disbanded female hard-rock band from Sweden
 "Drain", by X Japan from Dahlia

Places
 Drain, Oregon, a city in Douglas County, Oregon, United States
 Drain, Maine-et-Loire, a commune in France
 Waterloo & City line, in the London Underground, nicknamed "The Drain"

People with the surname
 Charles Drain (disambiguation), several people
 Dorothy Drain (1909–1996), Australian journalist, columnist, war correspondent, editor and poet
 Émile Drain (1890–1966), French actor and comedian
 Geoffrey Drain (1918–1993), British trade union leader
 Gershwin A. Drain (born 1949), American federal judge
 Jim Drain (born 1975), American artist
 Job Henry Charles Drain (1895–1975), English recipient of the Victoria Cross
 Lauren Drain  (born 1985), American author
 Robert D. Drain (born ), American judge
 Sammy Drain (1945–2016), guitarist
 Thomas Drain (born 1880), Scottish footballer
 Tracy Drain, flight systems engineer at NASA